Gerlinde Locker (born April 28, 1938 in Linz, Austria) is an Austrian actress.

Selected filmography
 War of the Maidens (1957)
 The Star of Santa Clara (1958)
 Sebastian Kneipp (1958)
 Endangered Girls (1958)
 Hello Taxi (1958)
 Candidates for Marriage (1958)
 My Daughter Patricia (1959)
 Girls for the Mambo-Bar (1959)
 Twelve Girls and One Man (1959)
 Do Not Send Your Wife to Italy (1960)
 The Forester's Daughter (1962)
 The Bandits of the Rio Grande (1965)
 Morning's at Seven (1968)
 Auch ich war nur ein mittelmäßiger Schüler (1974)
Derrick - Season 8, Episode 8: "Prozente" (1981)

References

External links

Hannelore Dietrich Agency Munich 

1938 births
Living people
Austrian film actresses
Austrian television actresses
20th-century Austrian actresses
21st-century Austrian actresses
Actors from Linz